Jérôme Besoigne (1686 in Paris – 1763) was a prominent Jansenist apologist and oppositionist to the Bull "Unigenitus."  He was ordained in 1715 and received a doctorate at the Sorbonne in 1718.

Besoigne was also assistant principal of the College of Plessis, but his defence of Jansenism and his opposition to the Bull "Unigenitus" obliged him to resign the post. In 1729, the Sorbonne erased him from the list of Doctors and, in 1731, he was exiled from Paris. During the following year he was allowed to return. He wrote a "History of the Abbey of Port Royal" (6 vols.), and "Lives of the Four Bishops engaged in the case of Port Royal". We have also from his pen two works on Scripture: "Concorde des livres de la Sagesse" (Paris, 1737), reprinted in Migne's "Cursus Completus" (XVIII) and "Morale des Apôtres ou concorde des épîtres de saint Paul et des épîtres cononiques du N. T." (Paris, 1747).

Bibliography
History of the Abbey of Port Royal (6 vols.),
Concorde des livres de la Sagesse (Paris, 1737)
Morale des Apôtres ou concorde des épîtres de saint Paul et des épîtres cononiques du N. T. (Paris, 1747).

References

External links
 

18th-century French Roman Catholic priests
University of Paris alumni
1686 births
1763 deaths
18th-century French writers
18th-century French male writers
French religious writers
French male non-fiction writers